Mislav Oršić (born 29 December 1992) is a Croatian professional footballer who plays as a left winger or attacking midfielder for  club Southampton and the Croatia national team.

Born in Zagreb, Oršić started his senior career at Inter Zaprešić in 2009. Following short stints with Spezia and Celje throughout 2013 and 2014, he moved to South Korea. After a successful stint with Ulsan Hyundai, Oršić was bought in 2018 by Croatian giants and his local club Dinamo Zagreb, whom he had supported since childhood. During almost five years at the club, Oršić established himself as a club legend, helping the club win four Prva HNL titles, and reach the quarter-finals of the UEFA Europa League for the first time in its history, and becoming the club's all-time leading goalscorer in the UEFA competitions in the process. In January 2023, Oršić moved to Southampton.

Oršić made his debut for the Croatia national team in 2019. He represented his country at the UEFA Euro 2020 and the 2022 FIFA World Cup, winning the bronze medal at the latter tournament.

Club career

Early career in Croatia, Italy and Slovenia
Coming from the Srednjaci neighborhood of Zagreb, Oršić started practicing football at the age of 5, with NK Zagreb, however, a few months later, the club dissolved its youngest categories. His next stop was the nearby NK Trešnjevka, where his father persuaded the club to let him train, despite not having categories that  At the age of 13, Oršić moved to NK Kustošija, before moving on to NK Inter Zaprešić in 2008.

Oršić started playing for Inter Zaprešić's first team in 2009. In the 2012–13 Prva HNL season he was team's top goalscorer in with 12 goals.
He moved to Spezia Calcio in the summer transfer window of 2013, and played 9 games for the club in the 2013–14 Serie B without scoring. The club ended up 8th in the league. He returned to Croatia and joined Rijeka for an unknown transfer fee, where he was subsequently loaned out to Slovenian club Celje from August to December of the 2014–15 season where he played 13 games and scored 2 goals, and then to South Korean club Jeonnam Dragons from February 2015 to January 2016 where he impressed with 9 goals from 33 games.

South Korean K League and Chinese Super League clubs

Jeonnam eventually signed him for €750,000 in the January transfer window of 2016. He did not play a single game for Rijeka. He registered his name as "Orša" (or in Revised Romanization of Korean, "Oreusya")  with the K League, because South Korean players had difficulty pronouncing his name.

Oršić spent another half a year at Jeonnam, where he played a further 16 games and scored 5 goals. He was sold to Changchun Yatai for €1.3 million, and he played for the remainder of 2016 in the Chinese Super League, scoring twice in 14 games. He returned to the K League in January 2017, signing for Ulsan Hyundai at the price of €935,000. He played for Ulsan for one and a half years, during which he won a Korean FA Cup title, before returning to Croatia and signing for Dinamo Zagreb in the 2018 summer transfer window.

Dinamo Zagreb

On 18 September 2019, Oršić scored a hat-trick for Dinamo Zagreb against Atalanta in his 2019–20 UEFA Champions League debut. On 18 March 2021, Oršić scored a hat-trick in a 3–0 win, of which the last goal came in extra time, against Tottenham Hotspur in the Europa League Round of 16, helping his team to win 3–2 on aggregate and reach the quarter-finals for the first time in the history of the club. Furthermore, the hat-trick brought his European goal tally to 17, making him the highest scoring player in European competitions in the history of the club, surpassing club legends Igor Cvitanović and Slaven Zambata. On 9 December 2021, he scored the only goal in the 1–0 away victory over West Ham United in the Europa League group stage, sending Dinamo to the knockout round play-offs.

On 6 September 2022, Oršić scored the first goal of the 2022–23 Champions League group stages in a famous 1–0 victory for Dinamo against Chelsea at the Maksimir. Following on from his goal against Chelsea, Oršić continued his fine form with another goal the following week against Milan, away at the San Siro. Dinamo would eventually lose the match 3–1. Despite the loss, with his goal, Oršić finally set his record for the highest scoring Dinamo player in European competitions in history, extending his European goal tally to 28.

Southampton
On 6 January 2023, Southampton announced the signing of Oršić from Dinamo Zagreb on a two-and-a-half-year contract. On 11 January, Oršić made his debut in a 2–0 quarter-final EFL Cup victory against Manchester City, replacing Adam Armstrong in the 83rd minute. On 21 January 2023, Oršić made his first Premier League appearance in a 0–1 home defeat to Aston Villa after he replaced Adam Armstrong in the 84th minute.

International career
Oršić made his international debut for Croatia on 9 September 2019 in a Euro 2020 qualifying match against Azerbaijan in Baku that ended as a 1–1 draw, coming on as a substitute for Ante Rebić in the 86th minute.

On 17 May 2021, he was selected in Zlatko Dalić's 26-man squad for the UEFA Euro 2020. At the tournament, he did not play a single minute until the knockout phase, when he was substituted on for Rebić in the 67th minute while Croatia were 3–1 down against Spain in the round of 16. He scored his debut international goal and provided Mario Pašalić with an assist to make the score 3–3; however, Spain won 5–3 after extra time.

Oršić was selected by Zlatko Dalić and named in Croatia's 26-man squad for the World Cup on 9 November 2022. On 27 November, in the 4–1 group stage victory over Canada, Oršić provided Lovro Majer with an assist for Croatia's fourth goal. On 9 December, in the quarter-final against Brazil, Oršić provided Bruno Petković with the assist for Croatia's extra time equaliser, taking the match to a penalty shootout. Oršić would score his penalty in the shootout, the final Croatian spot-kick before Marquinhos' miss, which sent Croatia to the semi-finals for the second consecutive World Cup. Oršić then scored the winning goal in the third place play-off against Morocco, which ended 2–1.

Personal life
Oršić is married to Suzana Krajinović, with whom he has two sons. He has Suzana's name tattooed on his right arm and kisses it in dedication to her whenever he scores a goal. In addition to his native Croatian, he is fluent in English.

Career statistics

Club

International

Scores and results list Croatia's goal tally first.

Honours
Ulsan Hyundai
Korean FA Cup: 2017

Dinamo Zagreb
Prva HNL: 2018–19, 2019–20, 2020–21, 2021–22
Croatian Cup: 2020–21
Croatian Super Cup: 2019, 2022

Croatia
FIFA World Cup third place: 2022

Individual
UEFA Europa League Squad of the Season: 2020–21
Football Oscar Team of the Year: 2020–21, 2021–22
24 Sata Croatian First League Team of the Year: 2020–21   
CIES Croatian First League Team of the Year: 2021–22 
Sportske Novosti Croatian First League Team of the Year: 2021–22 
GNK Dinamo Zagreb Goal of the Season 2021–22

References

External links
 

1992 births
Living people
Footballers from Zagreb
Association football midfielders
Croatian footballers
Croatia youth international footballers
Croatia under-21 international footballers
Croatia international footballers
UEFA Euro 2020 players
2022 FIFA World Cup players
NK Inter Zaprešić players
Spezia Calcio players
HNK Rijeka players
NK Celje players
Jeonnam Dragons players
Changchun Yatai F.C. players
Ulsan Hyundai FC players
GNK Dinamo Zagreb players
Southampton F.C. players
Croatian Football League players
Serie B players
Slovenian PrvaLiga players
K League 1 players
Chinese Super League players
Premier League players
Croatian expatriate footballers
Croatian expatriate sportspeople in Italy
Croatian expatriate sportspeople in Slovenia
Croatian expatriate sportspeople in South Korea
Croatian expatriate sportspeople in China
Croatian expatriate sportspeople in England
Expatriate footballers in Italy
Expatriate footballers in Slovenia
Expatriate footballers in South Korea
Expatriate footballers in China
Expatriate footballers in England